The National Indigenous Music Awards 2015 are the 12th annual National Indigenous Music Awards.

The nominations were announced on 10 July 2015 and the awards ceremony was held on 22 July 2015.

For the first time in National Indigenous Music Awards history two artists were awarded the Artist of the Year prize; Jessica Mauboy and Dan Sultan. An equal number of votes came in from the voting panel for each artist and the decision was made to honor both parties with this prestigious national award.

Executive Director of MusicNT & NIMA, Mark Smith, said "This year's finalists offer a diverse breath of fresh air within the mainstream music industry. They integrate a rich cultural heritage that illustrates an intimate connection to place and a respect for environment that resonates with the wider community. NIMAs is fast becoming known as the best event in the country for cross-cultural engagement; this is something we can all be very proud of".

Performers
Gurrumul
East Journey featuring Yothu Yindi
Frank Yamma
B2M
The Painted Ladies
Blekbala Mujik
Yirrmal
Zane Francis

Hall of Fame Inductee 
 Vic Simms and Blekbala Mujik

Triple J Unearthed National Indigenous Winner
 Zane Francis

Zane Francis is a young electronic/indie artist from Tweed Heads/Coolangatta. Francis uploaded his debut single "Acclimate" in January 2015. Triple J Music Director Dave Ruby Howe said "While the song only lasts for a shade over two minutes, they're nonetheless breathtaking with Zane's rich voice packing a devastatingly powerful emotional punch that grips your ears from the first listen and doesn't let go."

Awards
Artist of the Year

New Talent of the Year

Album of the Year

Film Clip of the Year

Song of the Year

Cover Art of the Year

Traditional Song of the Year

School Band of the Year

Community Clip of the Year

References

2015 in Australian music
2015 music awards
National Indigenous Music Awards